Daryl Szarenski (born March 14, 1968) is an American sport shooter who competes in pistol events. At the 2012 Summer Olympics, he finished 23rd in the qualifying round, failing to make the cut for the final. He has also competed at the 2000, 2004 and 2008 Summer Olympics.

Szarenski is Sergeant First Class with the U.S. Army. He studied industrial technology at Tennessee Tech University, where he competed both in the pistol and rifle, and later at Roger Williams University.

References

External links

 

1968 births
Living people
American male sport shooters
United States Distinguished Marksman
Olympic shooters of the United States
Shooters at the 2000 Summer Olympics
Shooters at the 2004 Summer Olympics
Shooters at the 2008 Summer Olympics
Shooters at the 2012 Summer Olympics
Sportspeople from Michigan
Shooters at the 1999 Pan American Games
Pan American Games medalists in shooting
Tennessee Tech Golden Eagles rifle shooters
Pan American Games gold medalists for the United States
Pan American Games silver medalists for the United States
Medalists at the 1999 Pan American Games
U.S. Army World Class Athlete Program